The  Synagogue of Čekiškė is a former synagogue in Čekiškė, Kaunas District Municipality, Lithuania.

Structure 

The synagogue is an unplastered, red brick structure. It has two main volumes, and is covered with a gable roof of asbestos sheets laid on top of old shingles.

The synagogue has a rectangular footprint. It consists of a spacious prayer hall on the eastern side and a two-story western volume, the ground floor of which houses a vestibule and one small room, and the upper floor was the women's section. The main entrance to the synagogue is situated on the southern façade. An outer wooden staircase leading to the women's section was most likely attached to the western façade. Foundations of some later annexes can be traced 9 m westwards from the today's western wall.  

The synagogue's exterior has been mostly preserved. 

The interior is divided by brick walls into the eastern prayer hall and two western rooms, above which the women's section was situated. The northwestern room apparently served as a small prayer and study room, since there is a niche with a protruding wooden frame in its eastern wall that looks like a small Torah ark.

History 
On July 22, 1887, a fire destroyed the majority of the infrastructure of Čekiškė, with only three buildings remaining. The majority of the population at the time were Jewish families. After the fire, the Synagogue of Čekiškė was rebuilt and remained unchanged to this day, although it is no longer in use.

After WWII, the synagogue was abandoned for a long time. During occupation by Soviet Union the building was converted into a kolkhoz granary.

In 2010 the building has been listed as regional monument of cultural heritage.

See also
Lithuanian Jews

References 

Synagogues in Lithuania
Čekiškė